Mount Gerizim (Samaritan Hebrew:  ʾĀ̊rgā̊rīzēm; Hebrew:  Har Gərīzīm;  Jabal Jarizīm or جَبَلُ ٱلطُّورِ Jabal at-Ṭūr) is one of two mountains in the immediate vicinity of the West Bank city of Nablus and biblical city of Shechem. It forms the southern side of the valley in which Nablus is situated, the northern side being formed by Mount Ebal. The mountain is particularly steep on the northern side, is sparsely covered at the top with shrubbery, and lower down there is a spring with a high yield of fresh water. For the Samaritan people, most of whom live around it, Mount Gerizim is considered the holiest place on Earth.

The mountain is mentioned in the Bible as the place where, upon first entering the Promised Land after the Exodus, the Israelites performed ceremonies of blessings, as they had been instructed by Moses.

Mount Gerizim is sacred to the Samaritans, who regard it, rather than Jerusalem's Temple Mount, as the location chosen by Yahweh (God) for a holy temple. In Samaritan tradition, it is the oldest and most central mountain in the world, towering above the Great Flood and providing the first land for Noah’s disembarkation. It is also the location where Abraham almost sacrificed his son Isaac. Jews, on the other hand, consider the location of the near-sacrifice to be Mount Moriah, traditionally identified by them with the Temple Mount. Mount Gerizim continues to be the centre of Samaritan religion to this day, and Samaritans ascend it three times a year: at Passover, Shavuot and Sukkot. Passover is still celebrated by the Samaritans with a lamb sacrifice on Mount Gerizim. Today, about half of the remaining Samaritans live in close proximity to Gerizim, mostly in the small village of Kiryat Luza. 

The Samaritan village of Kiryat Luza and an Israeli settlement, Har Brakha, are situated on the ridge of Mount Gerizim.

Biblical account

According to the Hebrew Bible, as related in Deuteronomy, when they first entered Canaan, the Israelites celebrated the event with ceremonies of blessings and cursings: the ceremonies of blessings took place on Mount Gerizim, and the cursings on nearby Mount Ebal. The Pulpit Commentary suggests that these mountains were selected probably "because they stand in the center of the Land both from north to south, and from east to west". A commentary in the Cambridge Bible for Schools and Colleges argues that "the face of Gerizim, the mount of blessing, is the more fertile; the opposite face of Ebal, the mount of curse, much the more bare", but the Pulpit Commentary states that both Gerizim and Ebal are "equally barren-looking, though neither is wholly destitute of culture and vegetation". 

The Masoretic Text, compiled between the 7th and 10th centuries of the Common Era, says that Moses had also commanded the Israelites to build an altar on Mount Ebal, constructed from natural (rather than cut) stones, to place stones there and whiten them with lime, to make sacrificial offerings on the altar, eat there, and write the Mosaic Law in stones there. The Samaritan Pentateuch, as well as an ancient manuscript of the biblical text found in Qumran, both bring the same excerpt as the Masoretic Text, with the only difference being the name "Gerizim", instead of "Ebal", therefore stating that Moses commanded the building of the altar on Mount Gerizim. Recent work on the Dead Sea Scrolls, which include the oldest surviving manuscripts of the biblical text, further supports the accuracy of the Samaritan Pentateuch's designation of Mount Gerizim, rather than Mount Ebal, as the first location in the Promised Land where Moses commanded an altar to be built.

All versions of the biblical text then have Moses' specifying how the Israelites should split between the two groups that were to pronounce blessings from Mount Gerizim and to pronounce curses from Mount Ebal. The tribes of Simeon, Levi, Judah, Issachar, Joseph, and Benjamin were to be sent to Gerizim, while those of Reuben, Gad, Asher, Zebulun, Dan, and Naphtali were to remain on Ebal.

The altar to God is again mentioned in the Book of Joshua, when, after the Battle of Ai, Joshua built an altar of unhewn stones, the Israelites made peace offerings on it, the law of Moses was written onto the stones, and the Israelites split into the two groups specified in Deuteronomy and pronounced blessings on Mount Gerizim and curses on Mount Ebal, as instructed in the law of Moses. Biblical scholars believe that the sources of the book of Joshua predate those of Deuteronomy, and hence that the order to build the altar and make the inscriptions is likely based on these actions in the sources of Joshua, rather than the other way around, possibly to provide an origin explanation for the events narrated in Joshua.

When Joshua was old and dying, he gathered the people together at Shechem (present-day Nablus) and gave a farewell speech, and set up "a stone as a witness", placing it "next to the sanctuary of Yahweh, under the oak tree", which indicates that a sanctuary to God existed there.

History

A Samaritan temple dedicated to Yahweh was built on Mount Gerizim during the 5th century BCE. It existed alongside the Jewish Second Temple in Jerusalem. By that point, the Israelites were divided as "Samaritans" and "Jews", both claiming descendance from the Biblical Israelites and preaching adherence to the Torah, but diverging on the holiest place on Earth to adore God: Mount Gerizim, for the Samaritans, and Jerusalem, for the Jews. 

An adjacent city was built by the Samaritans during the 3rd century BCE, and became the center for the Samaritan population. Religious rivalry between Samaritans and Jews led to Mount Gerizim being destroyed by the latter in 112-111 BCE, on orders of John Hyrcanus. The date of the Samaritan temple destruction, the 21st of Kislev, became a holiday for the Jews during which it is forbidden to eulogize the dead. 

Even after the destruction of their temple by the Jews, Mount Gerizim continued to be the holy place for the Samaritans, as mentioned in the New Testament. Coins produced by a Roman mint situated in Nablus, dated to 138–161 CE, seemingly depict the destroyed Samaritan temple, showing a huge temple complex, statues, and a substantive staircase leading from Nablus to the temple itself.

In the Book of John in the New Testament, in his discussion with the Samaritan woman at the well, Jesus reveals his feeling about worshipping in either Mount Gerizim (as the Samaritans did) or Jerusalem (as then did by the Jews):

Eventually, when Christianity became the state church of the Roman Empire, Samaritans were barred from worshiping on Mount Gerizim. In 475 CE a Christian church was built on its summit. In 529, Justinian I made Samaritanism illegal, and arranged for a protective wall to be constructed around the church. As a result, the same year, Julianus ben Sabar led a pro-Samaritan revolt, and by 530 had captured most of Samaria, destroying churches and killing the priests and officials. However, in 531, after Justinian enlisted the help of Ghassanids, the revolt was completely quashed, and surviving Samaritans were mostly enslaved or exiled. In 533 Justinian had a castle constructed on Mount Gerizim to protect the church from raids by the few disgruntled Samaritans left in the area.

Archaeology

Excavations at the site were initiated in 1983 and continued until 2006 and yielded tens of thousands of finds. Remnants found there identified that a Samaritan temple existed atop Mount Gerizim by the mid-5th century BC, and that it was eventually destroyed and rebuilt in the early 2nd century BC, only to be destroyed again in 111–110 BCE by Jewish forces under the orders of the Hasmonean leader John Hyrcanus.

The archeological finds have shown that the precincts of the Samaritan temple, not including its gates, measured 96 meters x 98 meters. Inside this perimeter, thousands of pottery vessels and burned bones of animal sacrifices – sheep, goats, cattle and doves – were found, as well as many stones with inscriptions containing the Tetragrammaton (the name of God).

In 475 CE, a Christian church was built on the Mount's summit. As a result of the fortified church and the previous Samaritan temple, extensive ruins still exist at the somewhat plateau-like top of Gerizim. The line of the wall around the church can easily be seen, as can portions of the former castle, and initial archaeological study of the site postulated that the castle built by Justinian had utilized stones from an earlier structure on the site, probably the Samaritan temple. In the centre of the plateau is a smooth surface, containing a hollow.

The excavation, initiated when the site was in the possession of Jordan and continued under Israeli rule, uncovered Corinthian columns, a large rectangular platform 215 ft by 145 ft (65m by 44m) surrounded by 6 ft (2m) thick and 30 ft (9m) high walls, and a 25 ft (8m) wide staircase leading down from the platform to a marbled esplanade. The complex also has a series of cisterns in which Late Roman ceramics were found. These discoveries, now named "Structure A", have been dated to the time of Hadrian, due to numismatics and external literary evidence. Underneath these remains were found a large stone structure built on top of the bedrock. This structure, now known as "Structure B", nearly half cubic (21m by 20m in width and length, and 8.5m high), consists almost entirely of unhewn limestone slabs, fitted together without any binding material, and has no internal rooms or dividing walls. The structure was surrounded by a courtyard similar to the platform above it (being 60m by 40m in size with 1.5m thick walls), and was dated to during or before the Hellenistic period by ceramics found in a cistern cut into the bedrock at the northern side. The excavating archaeologist considered "Structure B" to be the altar built by the Samaritans in the 5th or 6th century BCE.

Etymology and possible pre-Canaanite origins 
It is possible that the name of the mountain may mean mountain of the Gerizites, a tribe in the vicinity of the Philistines that, according to the Hebrew Bible, was conquered by David. 

Another possible straightforward etymology for Gerizim would give the meaning of mountain cut in two. 

According to the narrative about Jotham in the Book of Judges, Shechem was a site where there was a sanctuary of El-Berith, also known as Baal-Berith, meaning God of the covenant and Lord of the covenant, respectively; scholars have suggested that the Joshua story about the site derives from a covenant made there in Canaanite times. In the narrative of Judges, the pillar that was in Shechem is seemingly significant enough to have given its name to a nearby plain, and this pillar is thought to be likely to have been a totem of El-Berith; the Joshua story, of a stone being set up as a witness, simply being an attempt to provide an etiology in accordance with later Israelite theology.

See also
 Samaritanism
Samaritan Revolts

Notes and citations

External links

 The curses and blessings of Ebal and Gerizim, in isolation, at wikiversity
 Photos of Mount Gerizim
Mount Gerizim and the Samaritans
Photos of Mount Gerizim at the Manar al-Athar photo archive

Gerizim, Mount
Gerizim
Gerizim
Gerizim
Samaritan pilgrimage sites